Faes or FAES may refer to:

People 
 Inge Faes (born 1973), Belgian politician
 Pieter Faes (1750–1814), Flemish painter
 Rolf Faes (1916–1983), Swiss handball player
 Wout Faes (born 1998), Belgian footballer

Other uses 
 FAES (Fundación para el Análisis y los Estudios Sociales), a Spanish think tank
 FAES (Venezuela) (''Fuerzas de Acciones Especiales de la Policía Nacional Bolivariana), national police unit
 Fae folk, or fairies
 Faés, an uninhabited island in Laamu Atoll, Maldives

See also 
 FAE (disambiguation)